Sphenomorphus consobrinus  is a species of skink found in Indonesia.

References

consobrinus
Reptiles described in 1878
Taxa named by Wilhelm Peters
Taxa named by Frederick Stanley Parker